"So Far Away" is a song by British rock band Dire Straits, the opening track on their fifth studio album Brothers in Arms (1985). It became the band's fourth top 20 hit, peaking at number 19. The original studio version of the track appeared on the 2005 compilation The Best of Dire Straits & Mark Knopfler: Private Investigations.

Reception
Cash Box said that "with a punchy guitar hook [it] should walk right into the Top 10."

Single release
"So Far Away" was the lead single from Brothers in Arms in the UK and Europe on 12 April 1985. The song charted at number 20 in the UK, but also reached the Top 5 in Norway (number 4), Top 10 in Switzerland (number 6) and Sweden (number 7) and Top 40 in Italy (number 33). The single was also released in Australia and peaked at number 22.

After the song climbed to number 29 on the Billboard Hot Mainstream Rock Tracks chart in 1985, "So Far Away" was released a year later as the album's third single in North America, where it peaked at number 3 on the Hot Adult Contemporary Tracks chart and number 19 on the Billboard Hot 100, giving Dire Straits a third consecutive Top 20 hit from Brothers in Arms on the Hot 100.

B-side
The 1985 European releases of "So Far Away" featured another track from Brothers in Arms, "Walk of Life". This song would itself be released as the fourth official single from the album in Europe (second in North America) in late 1985 reaching number 7 on the Hot 100 and number 2 in the UK – the band's highest ever charted single in their homeland. The 7" featured an edited version of "So Far Away" that was also used on the LP, but the 12" featured the full length version that was on the CD version. It is sometimes erroneously credited as an extended mix.

In the United States, the song used for the B-side was "If I Had You", from Dire Straits' 1983 EP ExtendedancEPlay. In Canada, a Limited Edition double Vinyl featuring the full length version of "So Far Away" was released, along with live renditions of "Going Home" and "Sultans of Swing", the instrumental section of "Why Worry" and a Mark Knopfler solo effort, "Fear and Hatred".

Live versions
A live version was released as the B-Side of the Knopfler solo single Why Aye Man in 2002.

One of the songs on Mark Knopfler's 2006 album, Real Live Roadrunning, is a duet version of "So Far Away" with American country-folk singer Emmylou Harris.

Cover versions
Justin Wells covered the song on the 2016 album Dawn in the Distance.

Charts

References

Dire Straits songs
1985 singles
1985 songs
Songs about heartache
Songs about loneliness
Songs written by Mark Knopfler
Song recordings produced by Mark Knopfler
Vertigo Records singles
Warner Records singles